The St. Luke's Episcopal Church in Granville, Ohio is a historic church located at 111 E. Broadway Street in Granville.  The Greek Revival church building was constructed in 1837.  It was added to the National Register of Historic Places in 1976.

Its 1976 National Register nomination asserts flatly: "St. Luke's Episcopal Church is one of the finest examples of Greek
revival architecture in the United States today," and notes that the building is in excellent condition, in its original form from 1837.

Its exterior was designed for Alfred Avery by England-born Benjamin Morgan (1808-1851), who also designed a Greek Revival home, the Avery-Hunter House, in Granville for the same client. "St. Luke's is his main claim to fame and he requested to be buried from this church. He also submitted plans for the State Capitol in Columbus and was a consultant in its building. The ceiling and all lathing and plastering was done by Orren Bryant of Alexandria, Ohio. He was a farmer and also very skilled plasterer. He worked during the winter of 1838 on the moldings and cornices of deep relief and rich design."

Its interior was designed by renowned New York-based architect Minard Lafever, who provided specific designs for this church, and also was widely influential through his publication of pattern books.

The bell tower design was an adaptation by Benjamin Morgan of works by Asher Benjamin in the Connecticut River Valley, derived from designs in Asher Benjamin's books for workmen and builders.

It was documented by the Historic American Buildings Survey in 1934.

References

External links

Episcopal churches in Ohio
Churches on the National Register of Historic Places in Ohio
Greek Revival church buildings in Ohio
Churches completed in 1837
Buildings and structures in Licking County, Ohio
National Register of Historic Places in Licking County, Ohio
19th-century Episcopal church buildings